Edgeworthia chrysantha (common names: Oriental paperbush, mitsumata) is a plant in the family Thymelaeaceae.

Etymology
The genus was named in honour of Michael Pakenham Edgeworth (1812–1881), an Irish-born Victorian era amateur botanist, who worked for the East India Company, and for his sister, writer Maria Edgeworth. The Latin specific epithet chrysantha is in reference to the plant's yellow flowers.

Description
Flowers are yellow, have a sweet scent, and in clusters at the branch tips. The flowering period extends from February to April.

Distribution and habitat
This species is native to Myanmar and south-central and southeast China. It grows in forests and shrubby slopes.

Use 
The bark fibres of these plants are used for making the handmade Japanese tissue called "mitsumata paper".  Along with kōzo and gampi, it is used for making traditional Japanese paper (washi). Among other applications, mitsumata is used for banknotes as the paper is very durable. In China flowers, roots, and bark are used in traditional medicine.

Gallery

References

Further reading

External links

Plants for a future
Worldpress

Thymelaeoideae
Flora of China
Flora of Japan